The voiceless epiglottal affricate ( in IPA) is a rare affricate consonant that is initiated as an epiglottal stop  and released as a voiceless epiglottal fricative . It has not been reported to occur phonemically in any language.

Features
Features of the voiceless epiglottal affricate:

Occurrence

Notes

References 

 

Affricates
Pulmonic consonants
Voiceless oral consonants
Central consonants